Denis Cotter is an Irish celebrity chef, author, television personality and proprietor of the acclaimed vegetarian Café Paradiso restaurant in Cork City. He has published three cookbooks – "Cafe Paradiso Cookbook", "Paradiso Seasons" and "wild garlic, gooseberries...and me", and his fourth book was due to be published in 2011 by HarperCollins. He has featured on the RTÉ One television series Guerrilla Gourmet.

Style 
Cotter is described as a "vegetarian icon" and "hero to non-meat eaters", beginning his career as a banker before quitting to form his own restaurant business. His meals include goat's cheese gnocchi with pan-fried artichokes. In Café Paradiso, his Cork city restaurant, Cotter has evolved an 'innovative' style of vegetarian cooking, based on local produce and cheeses, and on a close working relationship with Gortnanain Farm just outside the city.

Career 
Cotter opened his award-winning Café Paradiso restaurant in Cork in 1993. He published his first cookbook in 1999, followed in 2003 by Paradiso Seasons, which was named as best vegetarian cookbook in the world at the Gourmand World Cookbook Fair in 2004. In 2007, his third book, 'wild garlic, gooseberries...and me", was published by HarperCollins and shortlisted for the Andre Simon awards. His fourth book, "for the love of food", was published in 2011.

Cotter is also a cookery teacher, and has taught at schools in Ireland such as The Tannery in Dungarvan, Co. Waterford, Ballymaloe Cookery School in Co. Cork and Donnybrook Fair in Dublin, as well as stints in the Stratford Chefs School and Jill's Table in Ontario, Canada.

In February 2008, Cotter featured in the third episode of Guerrilla Gourmet, a television series which had six professional chefs attempt to set up their own temporary restaurant in an unusual location. Cotter's challenge saw him construct a "Gary Larson-esque world where he turns reality inside out" – he established a vegetarian restaurant in the sale yard of Bandon Mart to attract local beef farmers to try his vegetarian options. Cotter's challenge was all the more trying for him because he possesses a fear of cattle.

Awards 
Cotter was named "Chef of the Year" by the Irish magazine 'Food & Wine' in 2005, and "Best Chef in Cork" by the Restaurants Association of Ireland in 2009. Café Paradiso is listed in the "Bridgestone 100 Best Places to Eat in Ireland" guidebook. It was voted "Best Restaurant in Munster" by the readers of 'Food & Wine' magazine in 2001, and the restaurant was also voted "Restaurant of the Year" by Les Routiers Ireland in 2004.

On 7 March 2009, the Irish Independent listed Cotter, alongside Neven Maguire of the MacNean Restaurant, Brian McCann of Shu and Martin Shanahan of Fishy Fishy Cafe, as a chef whom many would be surprised to learn has no Michelin stars to his name and never has had. At the time there were only six restaurants in possession of this accolade and all of them were in Dublin.

References

External links 
Café Paradiso

Irish chefs
Irish television personalities
People from County Cork
Living people
Cookbook writers
Year of birth missing (living people)
Irish television chefs
Vegetarian cookbook writers